Ragbi klub Nikšić is a Montenegrin rugby club based in Nikšić. It is the third youngest club in Montenegro. The first session was held on "Trebjesa" field on September 15, 2013. Since then, the club operates regularly on a semi-pro level. The biggest achievement of this young club is the third place that was won at international memorial tournament "Luka Marin" Novi Sad.
Nowadays, the club is competing in Montenegrin national league which consists of 5 clubs (Arsenal, Buducnost, Niksic, Lovcen and Mornar).

Current squad

The provisional Nikšić Rugby Squad for the season is:

References

Montenegrin rugby union teams
Sport in Nikšić